Henry Andrews Cotton (May 18, 1876 – May 8, 1933) was an American psychiatrist and the medical director of the New Jersey State Hospital at Trenton (now Trenton Psychiatric Hospital), in Trenton, New Jersey. During his tenure from 1907 to 1930, Cotton and his staff employed experimental surgery and bacteriology techniques on patients, which included the routine removal of some or all of patients' teeth as well as tonsils, spleens, colons, ovaries, and other organs. These pseudoscientific practices persisted even after statistical reviews disproved Cotton's claims of high cure rates and revealed high mortality rates as a result of these procedures.

Cotton became the medical director of the New Jersey State Hospital at Trenton at the age of 30. As director, Cotton implemented changes to how the hospital operated, such as abolishing mechanical restraints, and requiring daily staff meetings to discuss outpatient care. Cotton was motivated by the new medical research of the 20th century, and held the belief that various mental illnesses were caused by untreated infections in the body. This theory, called biological psychiatry, was introduced to him by Dr. Adolf Meyer, and was in contrast to the eugenic theories of the era that emphasized heredity. At the time, Cotton was a leading practitioner of biological psychiatry in the United States.

Education and career
Henry A. Cotton studied in Europe under Emil Kraepelin and Alois Alzheimer, considered the pioneers of the day, and was a student of Dr. Adolf Meyer of Johns Hopkins School of Medicine, who dominated American psychiatry in the early 1900s. He studied medicine at Johns Hopkins University and at University of Maryland.
Cotton began to implement the emerging medical theory of infection-based psychological disorders by pulling patients' teeth, as they were suspected of harboring infections. If this failed to cure a patient, he sought sources of infection in tonsils and sinuses and often a tonsillectomy was recommended as an additional treatment. If a cure was not achieved after these procedures, other organs were suspected of harboring infection. Testicles, ovaries, gall bladders, stomachs, spleens, cervixes, and especially colons were suspected as the focus of infection and were removed surgically.

Being before even rudimentary scientific methods such as control groups—and by extension, double-blind experiments—existed, statistical methodology for applications in human behaviour and medical research did not emerge during Cottons' lifetime. He could only follow faulty methods to compile data, much of it allowing for projection of anticipated results. He reported wonderful success with his procedures, with cure rates of 85%; this, in conjunction with the feeling at the time that investigating such biological causes, was the state of the art of medicine, brought him a great deal of attention, and worldwide praise. He was honoured at medical institutions and associations in the United States, the United Kingdom, and Europe and asked to make presentations about his work and to share information with others who practised the same or similar methods. Patients, or their families, begged to be treated at Trenton, and those who could not, demanded that their own doctors treat them with these new wonder-cures. The state acknowledged the savings in expenses to taxpayers from the new treatments and cures. In June 1922, the New York Times wrote in a  review of Cotton's published lectures:

At the State Hospital at Trenton, N.J., under the brilliant leadership of the medical director, Dr. Henry A. Cotton, there is on foot the most searching, aggressive, and profound scientific investigation that has yet been made of the whole field of mental and nervous disorders... there is hope, high hope... for the future.

In an era before antibiotics, surgery resulted in a very high rate of postoperative morbidity and mortality, largely from postoperative infection. Among his patients at this time was Margaret Fisher, daughter of wealthy and famed Yale economist Irving Fisher, who believed in the hygienic movement of the period. Diagnosed by physicians in Bloomingdale Asylum as schizophrenic, which was before the modern development of some pharmaceutical agents, Fisher had his daughter transferred to Trenton. However, because Cotton attributed her condition to a "marked retention of fecal matter in the cecal colon with marked enlargement of the colon in this area", she was subjected to a series of colonic surgeries before dying of streptococcal infection in 1919. The danger of surgery was recognised by some patients in the institution, who, despite their mental illness, developed a very rational fear of the surgical procedures, some resisting violently as they were forced into the operating theater in complete contradiction of what are now commonly accepted medical ethics. A paternalistic attitude and the permission of the family of seriously insane patients were the basis of intervention at the time.

Differences of professional opinion existed among psychiatrists regarding focal sepsis as a cause of psychosis and not all believed in the benefits of surgical intervention to achieve cures. Dr. Meyer, head of the most respected psychiatric clinic and training institution for psychiatrists in the United States, at Johns Hopkins University, accepted the theory. He was encouraged by a like-minded member of the state board of trustees who oversaw Trenton State Hospital to provide an independent professional review of the work of Cotton's staff. Meyer commissioned another of his former students who practised psychiatry on his staff at the Phipps Clinic, Dr. Phyllis Greenacre, to critique Cotton's work. Her study began in the fall of 1924 just after Meyer visited the hospital and privately had expressed concern about the statistical methods being applied to provide an assessment of Cotton's work. Cotton's staff made no effort to facilitate the study.

Investigation and controversy
From the outset, Greenacre's reports were critical, with regard to both the hospital, which she felt was as unwholesome as the typical asylum and Cotton, whom she found "singularly peculiar". She realised that the appearance and behaviour of almost all of the psychotic patients were disturbing to her because their teeth had been removed, making it difficult for them to eat or speak. Further reports cast serious doubt on Cotton's reported results; she found the staff records to be chaotic and the data to be internally contradictory. In 1925 criticism of the hospital reached the New Jersey State Senate, which launched an investigation with testimony from unhappy former patients and employees of the hospital. Countering the criticism, the trustees of the hospital confirmed their confidence in the staff and director and presented extensive professional praise of the hospital and the procedures followed under the direction of Cotton, whom they considered a pioneer. On September 24, 1925, The New York Times stated that, "eminent physicians and surgeons testified that the New Jersey State Hospital for the Insane was the most progressive institution in the world for the care of the insane and that the newer method of treating the insane by the removal of focal infection placed the institution in a unique position with respect to hospitals for the mentally ill" and related accolades given in support of Henry A. Cotton by many professionals and politicians.

Soon Cotton opened a private hospital in Trenton which did a hugely lucrative business treating mentally ill members of rich families seeking the most modern treatments for their conditions. Meyer reassigned Greenacre without completing her report and resisted her efforts to complete the report. Admitting a shared belief in the possibility that focal sepsis might be the source of mental illness, Meyer never pressed his protégé to confront the scientific analysis of the erroneous statistics the hospital staff provided to Cotton, his silence guaranteeing the continuance of the practices. Later Cotton would occasionally admit to death rates as high as 30% in his published papers. It appears that the true death rates were closer to 45% and that Cotton never fully recognised the errors his staff made in analyzing his work.

In the early 1930s, Cotton's rate of postoperative mortality began to be a matter of professional debate in the state department of institutions, with some concerned that he intended to press to resume his position at the state hospital. Another report on Cotton's work was begun in 1932 by Emil Frankel. He noted that he had seen Greenacre's report and agreed with it substantially, but his report also failed to be completed.

In October 1930, Cotton was retired from the state hospital and was appointed medical director emeritus. Although this ended the abominable surgeries which were so dangerous before the discovery of antibiotics, the hospital continued to adhere to Cotton's humane treatment guidelines and, to carry out his less risky medical procedures until the late 1950s. Henry A. Cotton continued to direct the staff at Charles Hospital until his death.

Henry A. Cotton died suddenly of a heart attack on May 8, 1933, in Trenton, New Jersey and was lauded in The New York Times and the local press, as well as international professional publications, for having been a pioneer seeking a better path for the treatment of the patients in mental hospitals.

In popular culture
A fictionalized Dr. Cotton was portrayed by actor John Hodgman in the Cinemax drama The Knick in 2014.

He is portrayed by Byron Jennings in Boardwalk Empire.

The story of Dr. Cotton was subjected to comedic treatment on the podcast The Dollop episode 290.

See also
Acres of Skin
The Plutonium Files
The Protest Psychosis: How Schizophrenia Became a Black Disease
Unethical human experimentation in the United States

References

Further reading
Madhouse: A Tragic Tale of Megalomania and Modern Medicine, Andrew Scull, Yale University Press, 2005.

External links
 
 
Chapter on Trenton's Charitable Institutions, including Trenton Hospital, from 1929 History book
One page article on Cotton by Andrew Scull

American psychiatrists
1876 births
1933 deaths
Physicians from New Jersey
Human subject research in the United States